Cheselbourne (sometimes spelled Chesilborne or Cheselborne) is a village and civil parish in Dorset, England, situated in the Dorset Downs,  north-east of Dorchester. In the 2011 census the parish had a population of 296.

The village, which contains a mix of buildings of different ages and styles, is spread along four lanes which meet here. It has a public house called the Rivers Arms. The 13th- to 14th-century parish church has a pinnacled tower with battlements, numerous gargoyles and a canonical sundial.

In 1086, in the Domesday Book Cheselbourne was recorded as Ceseburne; it had 36 households,  of meadow and one mill. It was in the hundred of Hilton and the lord and tenant-in-chief was Shaftesbury Abbey.

Cheselbourne used to be the site of a tradition known as "Treading in the Wheat", in which young women from the village would walk the fields on Palm Sunday, dressed in white.

At Lyscombe Farm in the northwest of the parish are the remains of an early 13th-century chapel. The nave was once used as a bakehouse and then a farmworker's dwelling. In 1957, a Dutch barn was built over the ruins.

References

External links 

Villages in Dorset